After Extra Time is a 1996 album by Michael Nyman with the Michael Nyman Band containing three tributes to Nyman's fandom of Association football: After Extra Time, the soundtrack to The Final Score, and Memorial. The latter is described as a remix, but is simply the 1992 recording from The Essential Michael Nyman Band.  It was included in order to put it together with his two other football-inspired works (he has since written another: see Acts of Beauty • Exit no Exit).  The album lists only three tracks, which has caused it to be erroneously reported that Memorial is track 3 and the others are all hidden tracks, but Memorial is track 26.  Therefore, a track listing, as the individual portions of the pieces are not named, is not useful.  The three pieces were recorded at separate times and thus have separate personnel lists.

After Extra Time
Tracks 1-16 29:29
The title of the album is inspired by the way Nyman's wife's rare first name, Aet, often appears in football scores, signifying "after extra time".  The piece was written in two layers, one in 1995, and one in 1996, which could be said to represent two teams.  The piece is also the basis for another work, "HRT [High Rise Terminal]", which was included by Relâche on their album, Pick It Up in 1997.

Team A
Andrew Findon, flute (doubling piccolo and baritone sax)
John Harle, soprano (doubling alto) sax
David Roach, alto (doubling tenor) sax
Catherine Musker, viola
Tony Hinnigan, cello

Team B
Steve Sidwell, trumpet
David Lee, horn
Nigel Barr, bass trombone
William Hawkes, violin
Ann Morfee, violin

Michael Nyman at the piano and Martin Elliott on bass guitar play for both teams, while the violins sometimes carry contradictory harmonies.

Published by Northlight Ltd. c/o Associated Music Publishers / (BMI)
producer: Michael Nyman, with Martin Elliott and David Roach
engineer: Michael J. Dutton
recorded, mixed and edited at Jet Recording Studio, Brussels

The Final Score
Tracks 17-25 23:19
The Final Score is a 1991 film by Matthew Whiteman from 1991.  This is the original soundtrack, part of which previously appeared on the collection Ai Confini/Interzone.  The documentary is about Nyman's favorite team, the Queens Park Rangers in the 1970s, when they were led by Stan Bowles.  Tracks 17 and 25 are the main and end titles, and all of the music is built on variations of a four-note bass line.

Personnel
Michael Nyman, piano/director
Alexander Balanescu, violin
Clare Connors, violin
Ann Morfee, violin
Catherine Musker, viola
Tony Hinnigan, cello
Justin Pearson, cello
Martin Elliott, bass guitar
John Harle, soprano & alto saxophone
David Roach, soprano & alto saxophone
Andrew Findon, baritone saxophone, flute & piccolo
Steve Sidwell, trumpet
Marjorie Dunn, horn
Nigel Barr, bass trombone
Published by Northlight Ltd. c/o Associated Music Publishers (BMI)
producer: Michael Nyman
engineer: Michael J. Dutton
recorded, mixed and edited at Windmill Lane Recording Studio, Dublin

Memorial (Remix)

Track 26 11:21
Nyman was in the process of composing Memorial when the Heysel Stadium disaster occurred in 1985, and the dirge-like work became to him immediately specifically about the 39 people killed in the accident.  The album booklet contains a review of the original performance written by Waldemar Janusczak, which Nyman says "suggests the way in which the piece attempted in a small way to heal a wound Europe saw as a consequence of the harshness of rampant Thatcherism."

Personnel
Michael Nyman, piano/director
Sarah Leonard, soprano
Alexander Balanescu, violin
Clare Connors, violin
Catherine Musker, viola
Tony Hinnigan, cello
Martin Elliott, bass guitar
John Harle, alto saxophone
David Roach, alto saxophone
Andrew Findon, baritone saxophone
Steve Sidwell, trumpet
Marjorie Dunn, horn
Nigel Barr, bass trombone, euphonium
Published by Northlight Ltd c/o Associated Music Publishers (BMI)
courtesy of Decca Records Limited
producer: Michael Nyman
engineer: Michael J. Dutton
recorded at JVC Victor Studios, Tokyo
mixed and edited at Kitsch Studio, Brussels

Album Personnel
design and illustration by Dave McKean
photographs of Michael Nyman by The Douglas Brothers

References

1996 albums
Albums with cover art by Dave McKean
Michael Nyman albums